Marlene Enright (born 1985) is an Irish singer-songwriter from County Cork.

Early life
Marlene Enright is a native of Bantry.

Career
Marlene Enright began as part of the Cork folk/Americana group The Hard Ground. Her debut solo album was released in 2017 and was nominated for the Choice Music Prize. Her voice has been described as mezzo-soprano.

Discography
Studio albums

Placemats and Second Cuts (2017)

References

External links
Official website

1985 births
20th-century Irish people
21st-century Irish people
Living people
Musicians from County Cork
Irish folk singers
Irish mezzo-sopranos
Irish women singers
People from Bantry